Celora is a given name. Notable people with this name include:

 Celora E. Martin (1834 – 1909), New York jurist, member of New York Supreme Court
 Celora M. Stoddard (1186 - 1943), Arizona politician and businessman, member of Arizona State Senate, grandson of Celora Martin

Masculine given names